Research online, purchase offline (ROPO) (also research online, buy offline, online-to-store or webrooming), is a modern trend in buying behaviour where customers research relevant product information to qualify their buying decision, before they actually decide to buy their favourite product in the local store.

The ROPO effect allows the advertiser to calculate their overall return on investment (ROI) more precisely, by multiplying their online sales with the O2S-factor. The result is the offline revenue which is influenced by the Online marketing investments. ROPO is often equated with Click and Collect, that is, the process of online reservation and subsequent pick-up of the product at the store. Both are segments of Multichannel marketing. According to a 2011 Google report 80 percent of all offline buyers research online, before they buy a product in a local store. Furthermore, in high item value industries ROPO already makes a significant share of total sales. This was also acknowledged by an analysis of the German retail association and PricewaterhouseCoopers.

Its opposite is showrooming: researching a product in a physical store before buying it online.

External links 

Business models